Parsons is a city in Labette County, Kansas, United States.  As of the 2020 census, the population of the city was 9,600.  It is the most populous city of Labette County, and the second-most populous city in the southeastern region of Kansas.  It is home to Labette Community College and the Parsons State Hospital & Training Center.

History

Parsons was named after Levi Parsons, president of the Missouri-Kansas-Texas (Katy) Railroad. The town was founded in 1870 and incorporated the following year by the railroad. The location for the town was chosen because it was where the two branches of the railroad being built from Junction City, Kansas and Sedalia, Missouri would meet, and was on a ridge between Labette Creek and Little Labette Creek, which were soon dammed to provide a water source. The railroad commenced building a massive rail yard, foundry, and locomotive shop at Parsons, which for many years was the third largest railroad facility west of the Mississippi River with only Kansas City and Los Angeles being larger. Settlers from nearby towns uprooted and moved to Parsons, and new settlers arrived on every incoming train.  Parsons soon became a major hub for several railroads including the Missouri Kansas & Texas Railroad, Parsons & Pacific Railroad, Kansas City & Pacific Railroad, and the Memphis, Kansas & Colorado Railroad. In the early part of the twentieth century, Parsons operated its own street car system, and also had an interurban electric railroad connecting it to the nearby cities of Cherryvale, Independence, Coffeyville, and Nowata.  During World War II it was home to the Kansas Ordnance Plant, which later operated for some years as the Kansas Army Ammunition Plant. In Spring of 2005, the munitions plant was placed on the BRAC list for closure. The community has rallied behind the current plant operator, Day and Zimmerman, to keep the company on the grounds after closure and to keep those jobs and more in the Parsons area. (See link to "Great Plains Industrial Park" in "External Links", below)

Hospital
Parsons is also home to the Parsons State Hospital & Training Center, which has been in operation since 1903 when it was opened as the Kansas State Hospital for Epileptics.

In 1957 the hospital was renamed Parsons State Hospital and Training Center. At that time it began providing programs for individuals with developmental disabilities. The hospital also includes residential services, the University Center on Developmental Disabilities and the Parsons Research Center for the University of Kansas, the Special Purpose School of the Southeast Regional Education Service Center. The Southeast Kansas Agricultural Research Center of Kansas State University is also located on the grounds, as is the Alzheimer's Association, Heart of America Chapter, Southeast Kansas Regional Office.

Library
The first library began as a subscription library in 1904 and was located in city hall.  Parsons Public Library, a Carnegie library, opened on May 18, 1909. A new library opened on April 18, 1977, and the former library has since been renovated to become a visual and performing arts center.

Industry
The sale of Katy Industries to Union Pacific, in 1988, eventually saw the loss of scores of railroad jobs and, in effect, severed a major part of Parsons' city history which stretched back to its 1871 incorporation.  While, in return, the city received a million dollars to help it recover (and so that it would not file lengthy paperwork opposing the sale and thus delaying it), that money is kept in a fund by the city government, which uses the accrued interest on economic development projects. The only reminder of the Katy Railroad is now found in the local historical society's museum, the annual Katy Days Festival and of course the tracks, over which trains now speed through Parsons. The Kansas Army Ammunition Plant also was down scaled in the 1980s.

2000-2020
On April 19, 2000, an F3 tornado cut a devastating path of destruction through the center of Parsons.  About 700 homes were damaged and about 100 destroyed, about 60 businesses were damaged and 11 destroyed.

On June 5, 2006 the National Trust for Historic Preservation named Parsons a 2006 Great American Main Street Award winner for its successful efforts in revitalizing its downtown area through historic preservation.  The award was presented during the 2006 National Main Streets Conference in New Orleans.  Parsons was one of only five cities receiving the 2006 award.
 
Parsons is the home of Dwayne's Photo, which became the last processor of K-14 Kodachrome film in the world and was the location of the final frame taken on the final roll of Kodachrome film produced. Parsons is featured prominently in the plot of the 2018 Netflix movie Kodachrome about a man who takes a road trip to develop a roll of Kodachrome film.

Film
The motion picture ZombieGeddon (2003) was filmed in Parsons in July 2002.

Geography
Parsons is located at  (37.339070, -95.269747). The city is at the junction of U.S. Route 59 and U.S. Route 400. Big Hill Lake is several miles to the west of the city, and Lake Parsons is situated northwest of the city.

The Kansas Army Ammunition Plant (KSAAP) is located southeast of the city. The installation is actively used as a munitions loading, assembly, and packing facility.

Climate

Demographics

2010 census
As of the census of 2010, there were 10,500 people, 4,351 households, and 2,586 families living in the city. The racial makeup of the city was 81.3% White, 18.6% African American, 1.4% Native American, 0.6% Asian, 0.8% from other races, and 4.3% from two or more races. Hispanic or Latino of any race were 16.7% of the population.

There were 4,351 households, of which 30.7% had children under the age of 18 living with them, 38.1% were married couples living together, 15.7% had a female householder with no husband present, 5.7% had a male householder with no wife present, and 40.6% were non-families. 34.4% of all households were made up of individuals, and 12.7% had someone living alone who was 65 years of age or older. The average household size was 2.33 and the average family size was 2.95.

The median age in the city was 37.8 years. 24.7% of residents were under the age of 18; 10.3% were between the ages of 18 and 24; 23.1% were from 25 to 44; 26.4% were from 45 to 64; and 15.4% were 65 years of age or older. The gender makeup of the city was 48.5% male and 51.5% female.

2000 census
As of the U.S. Census in 2000,  there were 11,514 people, 4,738 households, and 2,909 families living in the city. The racial makeup of the city was 85.54% White, 8.17% Black or African American, 1.12% Native American, 0.42% Asian, 0.01% Pacific Islander, 1.90% from other races, and 2.84% from two or more races. Hispanic or Latino of any race were 4.64% of the population.

There were 4,738 households, out of which 30.8% had children under the age of 18 living with them, 43.3% were married couples living together, 13.2% had a female householder with no husband present, and 38.6% were non-families. 33.8% of all households were made up of individuals, and 14.8% had someone living alone who was 65 years of age or older. The average household size was 2.32 and the average family size was 2.96.

In the city, the population was spread out, with 26.2% under the age of 18, 9.6% from 18 to 24, 26.2% from 25 to 44, 20.4% from 45 to 64, and 17.6% who were 65 years of age or older. The median age was 36 years. For every 100 females, there were 91.5 males. For every 100 females age 18 and over, there were 87.1 males.

The median income for a household in the city was $28,345, and the median income for a family was $36,557. Males had a median income of $28,667 versus $21,558 for females. The per capita income for the city was $15,763. About 9.9% of families and 14.6% of the population were below the poverty line, including 16.3% of those under age 18 and 11.5% of those age 65 or over.

Arts and culture

Events

Katy Days is an annual festival held Memorial Day weekend to celebrate the Missouri–Kansas–Texas Railroad, also known as "the Katy" railroad. The founders of the festival are Mary and Pete Hughes. Activities are held in Forest Park, the largest community park in Parsons, and typically include live music, food trucks, and a parade.

Education

College
 Labette Community College

Public
Parsons USD 503 public school district serves most of the city of Parsons:
 Parsons Senior High School (9-12)
 Parsons Middle School (6-8)
 Guthridge Elementary (4-5)
 Garfield Elementary (2-3)
 Lincoln Elementary (PreK-1)

Labette County USD 506 public school district serves southern and western parts of the city of Parsons:
 Meadow View Elementary (K-8)

Erie-Galesburg USD 101 public school district serves north of Parsons.

Private
 St. Patrick Catholic School (PreK-8)

Library
The first public library building in Parsons was the Carnegie Library, established in 1909. The Parsons Public Library moved to a modern facility in 1977.

Points of interest

 Parsons Arboretum
 Tri-City Airport
 Big Hill Lake
 Lake Parsons
 Neosho State Fishing Lake
 Oakwood Cemetery
 Parsons Historical Society Museum
 Forest Park

Notable people

 Gilbert Baker, civil rights activist and creator of the pride flag
 Fred Bradley, Major League Baseball pitcher
 Gil Britton, Major League Baseball player
 Jamie Anne (Brown) Allman, actress
 Buck Clayton aka Wilbur Dorsey Clayton, jazz musician
 William Coffin Coleman, founder of the Coleman Company, and mayor of Wichita, Kansas
 William W. Cranston, civil war soldier and medal of honor recipient 
 Walter Davidson, Sr., co-founder of Harley-Davidson Motor Company
 Pintip Dunn, author of young adult fiction
 Fletcher Flora, author
 Myron V. George, U.S. congressman
 Derrel Gofourth, NFL offensive lineman
 Bill Guthridge, college basketball coach
 George Harvey, professional football player
 Clancy Hayes, jazz musician
 Shaun Hill, NFL quarterback
 Jeff Kready, Broadway and television actor
 Roland Lakes, Wichita State and NFL lineman
 Deb Miller, Kansas Secretary of Transportation (2003–2012)
 Ajit Pai, former FCC Chairman
 George Pepperdine, founder of Western Auto and Pepperdine University
 ZaSu Pitts, film and television actress and comedian
 Payne Harry Ratner, Kansas Governor
 Clyde M. Reed, Kansas Governor and U.S. Senator
 Nell Donnelly Reed, businesswoman
 T. Claude Ryan, aviator, aerospace engineer
 Dan Smith, major league baseball player
 Clark Tippet, ballet dancer and choreographer
 Levi Watkins, heart surgeon and civil rights activist
 Ella B. Ensor Wilson, social reformer

References

Further reading

External links

 Parsons - Official
 Parsons - Directory of Public Officials
 Parsons Chamber of Commerce
 The Parsons Sun, local newspaper
 Parsons city map, KDOT

Cities in Kansas
Cities in Labette County, Kansas
Populated places established in 1870
1870 establishments in Kansas